The Oita Urban Classic is a one-day road cycling race held on the street circuit around the Oita Stadium on Kyushu Island, Japan.  It is sanctioned by UCI as a category 1.2 race of UCI Asia Tour since 2018.

The Oita Ikoinomichi Criterium is held on the day before the Oita Urban Classic.

The race was begun in 2014 as a JBCF race Oita Cycle Road Race, and it evolved to the UCI-sanctioned race in 2018.  In 2018 season, it was held in October .  In 2019 season, it was held in August to avoid conflict with 2019 Rugby World Cup which uses Oita Stadium.  Due to the COVID-19 pandemic, the UCI race of 2020 event was canceled, and JBCF race was held instead.

Winners

References

External links

 

Cycle races in Japan
UCI Asia Tour races
Recurring sporting events established in 2018